Gardening is a popular pastime in New Zealand. A 2007/2008 survey of physical activities found that 43% of New Zealanders had participated in gardening in the previous 12 months. A range of books, magazines and television programmes are dedicated to the topic.

New Zealand has restrictions on trading during the Easter holiday break, and in recent years garden supply centres have flouted the law and remained open.

Gardens
Ayrlies Garden
Caccia Birch House
Dunedin Chinese Garden
Government Gardens
Ohinetahi
Parnell Rose Gardens
Pukeiti Rhododendron Trust

Botanical gardens
Auckland Botanic Gardens
Bason Botanic Gardens
Christchurch Botanic Gardens
Dunedin Botanic Gardens
Gisborne Botanical Gardens
Hamilton Gardens
Otari-Wilton's Bush
Wellington Botanic Garden

Arboreta
Eastwoodhill Arboretum
Hackfalls Arboretum

Events
Ellerslie Flower Show
Auckland Flower Show
Taranaki Garden Festival

Gardeners and horticulturists

Maggie Barry presented a television show and writes a gardening column
Bob Berry
Lady Anne Berry
William Douglas Cook
Barbara Winifred Matthews
James William Matthews
Eion Scarrow
Emily Stevens

Environmental issues
With the European settlement of New Zealand, which occurred in relatively recent times from an ecological perspective, a wide range of plants were introduced into the country for both agriculture and for gardens. Many of the plants went on to become invasive species.

Some notable examples of invasive plants that are used in gardens include:
Agapanthus (Agapanthus praecox)
Blue morning glory (Ipomoea indica)
Old man's beard (Clematis vitalba)

See also
New Zealand Gardens Trust
Culture of New Zealand
Environment of New Zealand

References

Further reading

External links
New Zealand Gardens Trust
Royal New Zealand Institute of Horticulture
New Zealand Alpine Garden Society
Garden Design Society of New Zealand
"Garden plants invading our bush" at the Department of Conservation